Robert "Rocky" Laurie (1956 – June 2022) was an Australian rugby league footballer. He played for the Eastern Suburbs Roosters and the South Sydney Rabbitohs in the New South Wales Rugby League premiership.

Laurie along with Ian Schubert, both from the rural New South Wales (NSW) township of Wauchope, came to the Roosters in NSWRFL season 1975, although Laurie did not make his first grade debut till the following season. During the 1976 NSWRFL season, he played in the forwards, helping Eastern Suburbs to victory in their unofficial 1976 World Club Challenge match against British champions St. Helens in Sydney. However, his move to the South Sydney Rabbitohs proved a master stroke, with Laurie making the five-eighth position his own in the red and green. Laurie played his best football at Souths, carving up the opposition and setting up spectacular tries for players such as dynamic winger Terry Fahey. Laurie was awarded the 1980 Dally M Medal, the only South Sydney player to date to win the coveted award. Laurie played for Easts in their win at the final of the 1981 Craven Mild Cup.

In 1983, Laurie returned to Wauchope and captained a NSW Country representative side in a match against New Zealand's  South Island, Laurie starred in the match scoring 3 tries.

During the 1988 Great Britain Lions tour, Laurie captained a Northern Division side to victory over the visitors.

Rocky's younger brother, Mark Laurie, was a three-time premiership winner with the Parramatta club.

References 

1950s births
2022 deaths
City New South Wales rugby league team players
Country New South Wales rugby league team players
Indigenous Australian rugby league players
New South Wales rugby league team players
Rugby league five-eighths
Rugby league players from Wauchope, New South Wales
South Sydney Rabbitohs players
Sydney Roosters players
South Sydney Rabbitohs captains